Toronto Lake is a flood control lake in southeast Kansas, primarily in Woodson County.  It is located on the Verdigris River about 4 miles southeast of Toronto, Kansas.  The lake is maintained by the U.S. Army Corps of Engineers.

History
Toronto Lake was authorized in the Flood Control Act of 1941.  Construction started on the lake in November 1954 and it was completed in February 1960.  In addition to flood control, the lake serves for recreational purposes, to improve water quality, and potentially to supply water.

See also

 Cross Timbers State Park
 Fall River Lake, southwest of Toronto Lake
 List of Kansas state parks
 List of lakes, reservoirs, and dams in Kansas
 List of rivers of Kansas

References

External links
 Toronto Lake
 Woodson County Maps: Current, Historic, KDOT
 Greenwood County Maps: Current, Historic, KDOT

Protected areas of Greenwood County, Kansas
Reservoirs in Kansas
Protected areas of Woodson County, Kansas
Bodies of water of Woodson County, Kansas
Bodies of water of Greenwood County, Kansas